Sport climbing at the 26th Southeast Asian Games was held in Jakarta, Indonesia.

Participating nations
 Philippines
 Indonesia
 Malaysia
 Singapore
 Thailand
 Vietnam

Medal summary

Men

Women

Medal table

External links
  2011 Southeast Asian Games

2011 Southeast Asian Games events